Jan Kowal (born 8 July 1967) is a Polish ski jumper. He competed in the normal hill and large hill events at the 1988 Winter Olympics.

References

1967 births
Living people
Polish male ski jumpers
Olympic ski jumpers of Poland
Ski jumpers at the 1988 Winter Olympics
Sportspeople from Zakopane
20th-century Polish people